The AN/PEQ-2 Infrared Target Pointer/Illuminator/Aiming Light (ITPIAL) is a laser sight for use on rifles fitted with a Picatinny rail. It was manufactured by Insight Technology.

History

The AN/PEQ-2 succeeded the AN/PAQ-4C, which was designed in the early 1990s after the Persian Gulf War. It was widely used by US forces during the war in Afghanistan and the Iraq War.

The device is still seeing active service but is being withdrawn and replaced amongst U.S. Armed Forces. It was also part of the U.S. SOPMOD kit, though the device is being replaced by the new smaller LA-5/PEQ.

Operation
The AN/PEQ-2 has two infrared laser emitters—one narrow beam used for aiming the rifle, and one wide beam used for illuminating targets, like a flashlight. The beams can only be seen through night vision goggles. Each beam can be zeroed independently, and the illuminator's radius is adjustable. The two lasers are tied into one 6-mode switch, which has the following modes:

Turning the mode switch does not turn on the lasers. A recessed button on top of the device is tapped once to briefly turn on the lasers or tapped twice to turn the lasers on until deactivated, either by pressing a third time or by turning the mode switch to off. Additionally, an extra pressure switch can be plugged into the rear of the device and then placed virtually anywhere, limited only by the length of the pressure switch's cord; typically one to two feet. This pressure switch operates the same way as the recessed button.

AN/PEQ-2A
The AN/PEQ-2A upgrade incorporates a blue removable safety block which physically prevents turning the mode switch to any of the high power modes, which are capable of causing eye damage. Both variants are waterproof to a depth of 20 meters and run on two AA batteries.

See also
 Laser sight (firearms)
 AN/PEQ-6
 AN/PEQ-15
 AN/PEQ-16

References

External link

 QUALIFY WITH THE AN/PEQ-2A

Military electronics of the United States
Firearm sights
United States Marine Corps equipment
Military equipment introduced in the 1990s
Laser aiming modules